Robert Michael Cicherillo (born December 1, 1965) is an American IFBB professional bodybuilder.

Biography
Cicherillo's first bodybuilding competition was the 1981 Natural America, where he placed 4th in the teen tall class. His first NPC (National Physique Committee) event was the 1987 NPC Junior Nationals, where he won in the heavyweight class division. His first IFBB event was the IFBB North American championships, where he placed 4th. His first IFBB Night of Champions was in 2001, where he placed 11th. His first Mr. Olympia came the following year in 2002, where he placed 17th (equal last). 

Cicherillo is the co-host of the radio show and podcast Pro Bodybuilding Weekly with Dan Solomon, he recently left bodybuilding.com and joined BSN. He qualified for the 2006 Olympia by winning the 2006 Masters in New York but elected not to compete instead serving as host/emcee of the various Olympia contests.

Bob Cicherillo has been featured in many fitness and magazine articles, as well as being featured on the cover of the Flex magazine. He once appeared in the television sitcom Malcolm in the Middle and is a regular contributor to the fitness website Bodybuilding.com. In addition, Cicherillo has appeared in an ESPN SportsCenter commercial with Stuart Scott, a music video for the "You Are My Number One" song by the band Smash Mouth, and in the 2004 movie Dodgeball: A True Underdog Story, playing Rory, a bodybuilder at Ben Stiller's gym. He is also a member of the Screen Actors Guild. Chicherillo was also "Titan" on the original American Gladiators TV series.

Competition History
1981 Natural America, Teen Tall, 4th
1983 AAU Mr New York State, Teen Tall, 1st and Overall
1987 NPC Junior Nationals, HeavyWeight, 1st and Overall
1987 NPC Nationals, Heavyweight, 5th
1988 NPC USA Championships, Heavyweight, 8th
1989 NPC Nationals, Heavyweight, 4th
1989 North American Championships, Heavyweight, 4th
1989 NPC USA Championships, Heavyweight, 2nd
1990 NPC Nationals, Light-Heavyweight, 5th
1993 NPC USA Championships, Heavyweight, 8th
1995 NPC USA Championships, Heavyweight, 15th
1996 NPC Nationals, Heavyweight, 8th
1999 NPC Nationals, Heavyweight, 2nd
2000 NPC USA Championships, Super-Heavyweight, 1st and Overall
2001 Night of Champions, 11th
2001 Toronto Pro Invitational, 5th
2002 Night of Champions, 2nd
2002 Mr. Olympia, 18th
2002 Show of Strength Pro Championship, 7th
2002 Southwest Pro Cup, 2nd
2003 Night of Champions, 6th
2004 Arnold Classic, 11th
2004 Ironman Pro Invitational, 8th
2005 New York Pro Championships, 8th
2005 San Francisco Pro Invitational, 9th
2006 Masters Pro World, 1st

See also
List of male professional bodybuilders
List of female professional bodybuilders
Mr. Olympia
Arnold Classic

References

External links 
Bob Cicherillo's photos
Profile at Bodybuilding.com

1965 births
American bodybuilders
Living people
Professional bodybuilders